Rojas Peak is a peak in Antarctica rising to about 675 m in the southeastern part of Lemaire Island off Danco Coast, Graham Land. Named "Cerro Rojas" by the Chilean Antarctic Expedition, 1950–51, after Sargento Angel Gustavo Rojas, who disappeared in a blizzard while returning from hydrographic work at Discovery Bay, Greenwich Island, September 1, 1949.
 

Mountains of Graham Land
Danco Coast